Glu Mobile LLC is an American developer and publisher of video games for mobile phones and tablet computers.  Founded in San Francisco, California, in 2004, Glu offers products to multiple platforms including Java ME-based devices, Android, Windows Phone, Google Chrome, and Amazon. It was previously listed on Nasdaq before  it was acquired by Electronic Arts in April 2021.

History 
In December 2004, San Mateo, the California-based Sorrent merged with the London-based Macrospace. In June 2005 the merged company created a new corporate name: Glu Mobile.  That same year, Greg Ballard replaced Sorrent founder Scott Orr as CEO. In 2006, Glu Mobile acquired iFone and in 2007 it acquired Chinese mobile game producer Beijing Zhangzhong MIG Information Technology Co. Ltd. ("MIG").  In September 2007, Glu announced the launch of Asteroids for mobile phones. In March 2008, Glu acquired San Clemente-based mobile developer Superscape.

In January 2010, Niccolo de Masi joined Glu Mobile as the President and CEO. De Masi was previously CEO at Hands-On Mobile. Since his arrival, Glu has transitioned to a freemium business model focused around Glu's original IP.

On August 2, 2011, Glu acquired Griptonite Games. Its staff of 200 "approximately double[d]" Glu's internal development capacity.

In April 2012, Glu acquired the entire Deer Hunter franchise.

Glu Mobile bought Gamespy Technologies (the entity responsible for GameSpy multiplayer services) from IGN Entertainment in August 2012, and proceeded in December to raise integration costs and shut down servers for many older games, including the Star Wars: Battlefront series, Sniper Elite, Microsoft Flight Simulator X and Neverwinter Nights, with no warning to developers or consumers.  GameSpy Technologies remained operational and did not make any announcements of an impending shutdown; the two GameSpy companies were separate entities and only related by name.  Glu also shut down online multiplayer servers for several titles on the Nintendo DS and Wii, such as Mario Kart DS, Super Smash Bros. Brawl, and Mario Kart Wii.  Glu shut down the rest of Gamespy effective on May 31, 2014.

On September 3, 2014, PlayFirst was acquired by Glu. The official statement from Glu Mobile CEO Niccolo de Masi read "We are pleased to officially add PlayFirst to the Glu family and look forward to delivering new DASH products to a worldwide audience."

In April 2015, Chinese company Tencent paid $126 million for a 15% stake in Glu Mobile. It had 20.8% as of 2017.

On December 22, 2016, it was announced that Glu Mobile had acquired the trivia game QuizUp for 7.5 million. On January 20, 2021, QuizUp was removed from appstores, and on January 21, 2021, it was announced that QuizUp will be discontinued on March 22, 2021. Since then, all purchases are disabled.

In November 2016, Nick Earl became CEO. The majority stake of Glu shares are held by institutions: at the start of the third quarter of 2012, institutional ownership was 78% of the outstanding shares according to Google Finance.

Electronic Arts announced in February 2021 that it plans to acquire Glu in a deal estimated at US$2.4 billion. On the same day of the announcement of the deal, it was revealed that the companies expect the acquisition to close in the second quarter of 2021. In April 2021, EA completed the acquisition of Glu Mobile.

Games

 1000: Find 'Em All
 5-Card Draw Poker
 Adidas All-Star Football
 Age of Empires III Mobile
 ALIENS: Unleashed
 Alpha Wing 2
 Amazing Battle Creatures (ABC)
 Ancient Empires
 Ancient Empires II
 Aqua Teen Hunger Force
 Asteroids
 AstroPop
 ATV Off-Road Fury
 Baldur's Gate
 Battleship
 Beat It!
 Big Time Gangsta
 Blackjack Hustler
 Blood & Glory
 Blood & Glory 2: Legend
 Bombshells: Hell's Belles
 Bonsai Blast
 Brain Genius
 Brain Genius 2
 Brain Genius 2 Deluxe
 Brain Genius Deluxe
 Brian Lara International Cricket 2007
 Britney Spears: American Dream
 Bush vs. Kerry Boxing
 Call of Duty 4: Modern Warfare
 Call of Duty: Black Ops Mobile
 Call of Duty: Modern Warfare – Force Recon (based on Call of Duty: Modern Warfare 2)
 Call of Duty: World at War
 Cannons
 Cannons Tournament
 Car Town
 Centipede
 Chaos Engine
 Chu Chu Rocket
 Cluedo
 Cluedo SFX
 Concentration
 Codename: KND MINIGAMES
 Colin McRae DiRT Mobile
 Cooking Dash
 Contract Killer
 Contract Killer 2
 Contract Killer Sniper
 Contract Killer: Zombies
 Contract Killer: Zombies 2
 Courage the Cowardly Dog: Haunted House
 Cooking Dash
 Crash 'N' Burn
 Crash 'N' Burn Turbo
 Daily Puzzle
 Death Dome
 Deer Hunter
 Deer Hunter 2
 Deer Hunter 3
 Deer Hunter Reloaded
 Deer Hunter 3D
 Deer Hunter Challenge
 Deer Hunter Classic
 Design Home
 Dexter's Laboratory: Security Alert!
 Diner Dash
 Diner Dash 2: Restaurant Rescue
 Diner Dash 3
 Diner Dash 5: Boom!
 Diner Dash: Flo on the Go
 Diner Dash: Flo Through Time
 Diner Dash: Hometown Hero
 Diner Dash Adventures (App Store)
 Dino Hunter: Deadly Shores
 Disney Sorcerer's Arena
 Dominoes
 Dragon Island
 Driver 3 (mobile version)
 Driver: Vegas
 Ed, Edd n Eddy: Giant Jawbreakers
 Enchant U
 Eternity Warriors
 Eternity Warriors 2
 Eternity Warriors 3
 everGirl everGems
 Family Feud
 Family Guy: Time Warped
 Family Guy: Uncensored
 Fatal Force: Earth Assault
 Foster's Home: Balloon Bonanza
 FOX Sports Football '06
 Frontline Commando
 Frontline Commando 2
 Frontline Commando: D-Day
 Frontline Commando: WW2 Shooter
 Game of Life
 Gears & Guts
 Get Cookin
 Glyder
 Glyder 2
 Guitar Hero 5
 Guitar Hero: Warriors of Rock
 Gun Bros (Windows Phone)
 Hero Project
 Hercules
 High Heels MahJong: In Her Shoes
 Hog On the Run
 HOYLE 6-in-1 Solitaire Pro
 Ice Age: Dawn of the Dinosaurs
 Ice Age: The Meltdown
 Indestructible
 Insaniquarium Deluxe
 Inuyasha
 Jamaican Bobsled
 Kasparov Chess
 Kim Kardashian: Hollywood
 Kendall and Kylie
 Katy Perry Pop
 Kingdom of Heaven
 Lemmings
 Lemmings Return
 Lil Kingdom
 LMA Manager 2008 
 Love a Lemming
 Manchester United Football
 Marc Ecko's Getting Up
 Mech Battalion
 Men vs. Machines
 Mission: Impossible – Rogue Nation
 MLB Tap Sports Baseball 2018
 MLB Tap Sports Baseball 2019
 MLB Tap Sports Baseball 2020
 MLB Tap Sports Baseball 2021
 Monopoly
 MONOPOLY HERE & NOW
 Monsters vs. Aliens
 Mr. & Mrs. Smith
 My Dragon
 Nicki Minaj: The Empire
 Project Gotham Racing Mobile
 QuizUp
 Racing Rivals
 Ren & Stimpy Pinball
 Restaurant DASH with Gordon Ramsay
 Reversi
 Robots
 Samurai VS Zombies Defence
 Samubies Defense 2
 Scooby-Doo!: Castle Capers
 Scooby-Doo! 2: Dark Dungeons
 Shadowalker
 SIMON
 Small Street
 Sniper X
 Space Monkey
 Speedball 2 Brutal Deluxe
 Spider-Man: Shattered Dimensions (DS version)
 Spider-Man: Web of Shadows (DS version)
 SpongeBob SquarePants: Prom of Doom
 Star Blitz
 Stardom: The A-List
 Stardom: Hollywood
 Stranded
 Stranded: Mysteries of Time
 Super KO Boxing 2
 Super KO Boxing!
 Tap Sports Baseball 2015
 Tap Sports Baseball 2016
 Tap Sports Baseball 2017
 Tavern Quest
 The Chaos Engine
 The Flintstones Bedrock Bowling
 The Flintstones: Grocery Hunt
 The Lord of the Rings: Middle-Earth Defense
 The Powerpuff Girls: Bad Mojo
 The Price Is Right
 The Swift Life
 Tom and Jerry: Cheese Chase
 Tom and Jerry: Food Fight
 Tony Hawk: Vert
 Terminator Genisys: Revolution
 Transformers (based on the film of the same name)
 Transformers G1: Awakening
 Transformers: Revenge of the Fallen
 VBirds
 Virtua Tennis
 Wacky Races
 Watchmen (based on the film of the same name)
 Who Wants to Be a Millionaire?
 Who Wants to Be a Millionaire?: Celebrity Edition
 World Series of Poker – Hold'em Legend
 World Series of Poker – Pro Challenge
 World Series of Poker Player Advisor
 World Series of Poker: Texas Hold'em
 Yogi Bear Pic-A-Nic
 Zuma

References

External links 
 

2005 establishments in California
2021 mergers and acquisitions
American companies established in 2005
Companies based in San Francisco
Companies formerly listed on the Nasdaq
Electronic Arts
Mobile game companies
Video game companies established in 2005
Video game development companies
Video game publishers